Diana Popova (born December 10, 1976 in Sofia, Bulgaria) is an Individual Rhythmic Gymnast.

Career 
She started rhythmic gymnastics in 1982 and started training at an early age.

Popova competed at the 1992 Summer Olympics, Despite two drops of the clubs, she finished 7th in the all-around. 
In 1993, Popova made a brief retirement, citing exhaustion but returned to competition shortly after in 1994. She had a good comeback finishing 8th in 1994 and 7th in 1995 at the World Championships, she also took home 5 medals (including the all-around bronze) at that year's World University Games.  She also won three bronze medals at the 1996 European Championships in Team, Rope and Ribbon.
She competed in her second Olympics in 1996, but a couple of small mistakes in the semifinal round dropped Popova to 11th place and denied her the chance to compete in her second Olympic final.

After her retirement in 1996, Popova married the son of famed Bulgarian coach Julieta Shishmanova. Popova has since relocated to Italy, where she accepted a coaching position with the national team.

External links
 

1976 births
Living people
Bulgarian rhythmic gymnasts
Bulgarian expatriates in Italy
Medalists at the Rhythmic Gymnastics World Championships
Medalists at the Rhythmic Gymnastics European Championships